Francisco Guillermo Grahl (born 5 March 1992) is an Argentine professional footballer who plays as a midfielder for Central Córdoba.

Career
After spells in the youth of Manuel Belgrano, Unión de Belgrano and Almirante Brown, Grahl started his senior career with the latter in 2008. He played six times between 2008 and 2010. In July 2010, Grahl joined Argentine Primera División side Boca Juniors on loan. His loan was made permanent in 2011. Grahl left Boca without featuring in 2013 and returned to Almirante Brown. He scored the first professional goal of his career for the club on 8 December 2013 in a Primera B Nacional draw with Huracán. In the 2013–14 season, Grahl made thirty-two appearances for Almirante Brown and scored six goals.

In July 2014, Grahl joined Atlético Tucumán of Primera B Nacional. He scored his opening Tucumán goal in his second appearance in an away win versus Unión Santa Fe. He played twenty times in his debut campaign, prior to participating in eighteen games in Tucumán's title-winning run of 2015. He failed to make an appearance in the 2016 Argentine Primera División and was subsequently sent out on loan to Almagro for the 2016–17 season. He played thirty-eight matches and scored three for Almagro. San Martín signed Grahl in July 2018. His league debut was also his 100th career appearance; vs. Belgrano on 11 August.

Career statistics
.

Honours
Almirante Brown
Primera B Metropolitana: 2009–10

Atlético Tucumán
Primera B Nacional: 2015

References

External links

1992 births
Living people
People from La Matanza Partido
Argentine people of German descent
Argentine footballers
Association football midfielders
Primera B Metropolitana players
Primera Nacional players
Argentine Primera División players
Club Almirante Brown footballers
Boca Juniors footballers
Atlético Tucumán footballers
Club Almagro players
San Martín de San Juan footballers
Aldosivi footballers
Central Córdoba de Santiago del Estero footballers
Sportspeople from Buenos Aires Province